, formally the  is a magnetic levitation train line in Aichi Prefecture, Japan, near the city of Nagoya. While primarily built to serve the Expo 2005 fair site, the line now operates to serve the local community.

It is also the world's first uncrewed commercial urban maglev. Linimo was the fourth overall commercial urban maglev operated in the world, predated by the Birmingham Maglev (1984–1995), the Berlin M-Bahn (1989–1991) and the Shanghai Maglev (opened in 2004).

Specifications
The line uses automatic train control (ATC) and automatic train operation (ATO). Construction of the track cost ¥60 billion (US$575 million) while the Linimo trains themselves, built by Nippon Sharyo, cost ¥40.5 billion (US$380 million). The construction cost came to roughly $65 million per km without rolling stock.

Rolling stock
The trains for the line were designed by the Chubu HSST Development Corporation, which also operated a test track in Nagoya. They were built by Nippon Sharyo, cost ¥40.5 billion (US$380 million). The trains are fixed 3-car train sets (Mc1+M+Mc2). The Mc car has a capacity of 34 seated and 46 standing, and the M car 36 seated and 48 standing, for a total capacity per train set of 244. The cars have a semi-monocoque construction of welded aluminum, with two emergency doors at each car end and two  doors per side.

Technical and financial difficulties

Being the first commercial implementation of a new type of transport system, the line suffered a number of highly publicized technical breakdowns during the Expo, with far higher demand during peak hours than the line's carrying capacity of 4,000 passengers per direction per hour. On March 19, 2005 and again on March 24, the number of people inside the trains exceeded the design capacity of 244 passengers and the train was unable to levitate.  The line also has to be shut down for safety reasons when wind speed exceeds , a relatively common occurrence in the area.

During the Expo, the line carried an average of 31,000 passengers per day, but ridership dropped to only 12,000 in the first six months after the Expo, and the line lost over ¥3 billion in 2006.  While ridership gradually increased to 16,500 passengers per day in 2008, the line still made a financial loss of ¥2.1 billion in fiscal year 2009.
In 2016, the line started turning a profit, making a net profit of ¥83.4 million that year.

Construction history

 October 3, 2001 – Permission to build the line granted
 March 6, 2005 – Line opened to the public
 July 3, 2005 – Ten millionth passenger
 April 1, 2006 – Stations L07 and L09 renamed

Stations

Footnotes

Cancelled plan in Taiwan
In 2006, there was a plan to use the system for the Xinyi LRT, a proposed line in Xinyi, Taipei, Taiwan. The line was later cancelled in 2007.

See also
 Expo 2005
 High Speed Surface Transport

References

External links

  (in Japanese)
  (in English)
 The International Maglevboard

People mover systems in Japan
Driverless Maglev
Public transport in Japan
Magnetic propulsion devices
Rail transport in Aichi Prefecture
Railway lines opened in 2005